Byline Times is a British newspaper and website founded in October 2018 by Peter Jukes and Stephen Colegrave, who are also its executive editors. It is a development of Byline, a crowdfunding and media outlet platform founded in April 2015 by Seung-yoon Lee and Daniel Tudor.

The newspaper is published monthly for subscribers, while BylineTimes.com functions as a free news site. Byline Times sister organisations are the crowdfunding journalism platform Byline.com, investigative unit Byline Investigates, the Byline Times Podcast, Byline Books and the annual summer event Byline Festival. All are separate entities. 

The editor of Byline Times is Hardeep Matharu. Other notable staff include its Special Investigations Reporter Nafeez Ahmed, former Spectator Political Columnist Peter Oborne, former BBC journalist Adrian Goldberg who hosts the Byline Times Podcast, former BBC Panorama reporter John Sweeney and author Otto English. The paper has also had contributions from other notable people, such as actor and comedian John Cleese.

Interviewed in 2019, Matharu described the purpose of Byline Times as to "really dig down and investigate [...] pressing social issues, many of them to do with justice, or a lack of, which for one reason or another are not being widely or extensively reported on elsewhere." Jukes described the newspaper as providing "what the [other] papers don't say" and said it would be similar in tone to the broadsheet news magazine FT Weekend.

Stories broken by Byline Times have often been picked up by other media outlets. These include allegations of cronyism in the Johnson government's allocation of contracts during the COVID-19 pandemic.

In 2020, Byline Media collaborated with George Llewelyn & Caolan Robertson to create Byline TV, a subscriber-funded video channel.

See also
 Alternative media in the United Kingdom

References

External links

Byline TV

British political websites
Internet properties established in 2018
Investigative journalism
National newspapers published in the United Kingdom
Crowdfunded journalism